The First Presbyterian Church and Cemetery in Flandreau, South Dakota was listed on the National Register of Historic Places in 2017.

Built in 1873, the church is the oldest continuously operating church in the state.  The church was deemed notable for its "significant association with the earliest settlement of the Flandreau homestead colony by the Mdewakanton Dakota American Indians and with the leadership of Rev. John Eastman for his involvement in the religious, social and political life of the community."  The cemetery was deemed notable for its graves, including the 1971 reinterment of Chief Taoyateduta/Little Crow, who was a leader of the Mdewakanton Dakota in the 1850s and during the U.S.-Dakota War of 1862.

References

National Register of Historic Places in Moody County, South Dakota
Churches in Moody County, South Dakota
Churches completed in 1873
Cemeteries in South Dakota
Presbyterian churches in South Dakota